Sévry is a commune in the Cher department in the Centre-Val de Loire region of France.

Geography

Population

Sights
 Traces of the demolished church.
 The chateau of Sévry.

See also
Communes of the Cher department

References

Communes of Cher (department)